The Greenaway Baronetcy, of Coombe in the County of Surrey, is a title in the Baronetage of the United Kingdom. It was created on 23 October 1933 for Percy Walter Greenaway. He was Chairman of Daniel Greenaway & Sons, printers and stationers, and served as Lord Mayor of London from 1932 to 1933. As of 2015 the title is held by his great-grandson, the fourth Baronet, who succeeded his father in that year.

Greenaway baronets, of Coombe (1933)
Sir Percy Walter Greenaway, 1st Baronet (1874–1956)
Sir Derek Burdick Greenaway, 2nd Baronet (1910–1994)
Sir John Michael Burdick Greenaway, 3rd Baronet (1944–2015)
Sir Thomas Edward Burdick Greenaway, 4th Baronet (born 1985)

Notes

Baronetcies in the Baronetage of the United Kingdom